Bologna F.C. 1909 are an Italian football club which are based in Bologna. During the 2013–14 campaign, they will compete in the Serie A and the Coppa Italia.

Squad
.

Transfers

Competitions

Serie A

League table

Matches

Coppa Italia

Squad statistics

Appearances and goals

|-
! colspan="10" style="background:#dcdcdc; text-align:center"| Goalkeepers

|-
! colspan="10" style="background:#dcdcdc; text-align:center"| Defenders

|-
! colspan="10" style="background:#dcdcdc; text-align:center"| Midfielders

|-
! colspan="10" style="background:#dcdcdc; text-align:center"| Forwards

Top scorers
This includes all competitive matches.  The list is sorted by shirt number when total goals are equal.
{| class="wikitable sortable" style="font-size: 95%; text-align: center;"
|-
!width=15|
!width=15|
!width=15|
!width=15|
!width=150|Name
!width=80|Serie A
!width=80|Coppa Italia
!width=80|Total
|-
|1
|23
|FW
|
|Alessandro Diamanti
|3
|1
|4
|-
|2
|8
|MF
|
|Panagiotis Kone
|2
|0
|2
|-
|=
|13
|MF
|
|Diego Laxalt
|2
|0
|2
|-
|4
|9
|FW
|
|Rolando Bianchi
|1
|0
|1
|-
|=
|14
|DF
|
|Cesare Natali
|1
|0
|1
|-
|=
|16
|DF
|
|György Garics
|1
|0
|1
|-
|=
|24
|MF
|
|Michele Pazienza
|1
|0
|1
|-
|=
|75
|DF
|
|José Ángel Crespo
|1
|0
|1
|-
|=
|90
|FW
|
|Davide Moscardelli
|1
|0
|1
|-
|=
|99
|FW
|
|Jonathan Cristaldo
|1
|0
|1

References

External links

Bologna F.C. 1909 seasons
Bologna